Rejów  is a village in the administrative district of Gmina Nowe Miasteczko, within Nowa Sól County, Lubusz Voivodeship, in western Poland.

The village has an approximate population of 200.

References

Villages in Nowa Sól County